The Ibrahim Pasha Mosque, also known as the Telelka Mosque (Xhamia e Telelkave), is a historic Ottoman mosque in Berat, Albania. It is a national Cultural Monument of Albania.

The mosque was built by the governor Ibrahim Pasha Vlora at the end of the 18th century and rebuilt in 1852. During the communist dictatorship of Enver Hoxha, the minaret of the Ibrahim Pasha Vlora mosque got destroyed in 1967 and the building turned into a wood factory. It is located exactly between the Lead Mosque and the King Mosque.

The mosque is still used as a wood workshop. The person who used it was rented out of the muftiate which belongs to the Muslim Community of Albania (KMSH).

References 

Cultural Monuments of Albania
Mosques in Berat
Ottoman architecture in Albania
Mosques destroyed by communists